The Plot in You is an American rock band formed in Hancock County, Ohio in 2010. Originally a side project of former Before Their Eyes member Landon Tewers, the group is composed of Tewers, guitarist Josh Childress, bassist Ethan Yoder and drummer Michael Cooper.

The Plot in You have released one EP and five studio albums. Their EP Wife Beater was released in 2010, followed by their debut studio album First Born in 2011, and second studio album Could You Watch Your Children Burn in 2013. On July 17, 2015, the band announced their signing with StaySick Recordings and Happiness in Self Destruction was released on October 16, 2015. On June 15, 2017, they parted ways with StaySick Recordings and signed to Fearless Records while also announced their fourth studio album Dispose, which was released on February 16, 2018. Their fifth studio album, Swan Song, was released on September 17, 2021.

History

Formation, name change and First Born (2010–2011)
Beginning as a side project to guitarist/vocalist Landon Tewers while a part of the post-hardcore band, Before Their Eyes under the name "Vessels". Vessels would go on to release a debut EP recorded and produced by himself titled Wife Beater through InVogue Records the label that Before Their Eyes was also signed to. Shortly after the release of Wife Beater, Tewers saw the potential of Vessels and decided to leave Before Their Eyes. He would then go on to change the band's name "The Plot in You" and recruit guitarists Anthony Thoma and Josh Childress, bassist Ethan Yoder, and drummer Cole Worden for live performances choosing to create the music independently from the rest of the band. Near the end of 2010, the band announced that they had signed to Rise Records and with Tewers admitting that he had already begun working on the material for an album with an expected release for early next year.

On October 21, 2010, the band set out on their first tour as support for A Plea for Purging "The Mosh PotatTour" in December alongside Your Memorial and Within the Ruins. The band would go on to release two promotional singles from their forthcoming new album, "Unwelcome" on November 29 and "Miscarriage" on February 24. The last song the band would go on to release prior to their album would be a cover of Rob Zombie's "Superbeast" which was released on March 30 on the band's Facebook page.

On April 19, 2011, the band official released their debut album, First Born, through Rise Records and would go on to tour extensively throughout 2011 and 2012. 
At the end of the summer of 2011, the band would begin working on a music video for the song, "Miscarriage" which they would release on September 1. The band would join Thick as Blood, Legend and We Are Defiance on their "Circle of Friends Tour" before embarking on A Bullet for Pretty Boy for their fall "The Revision:Revise Tour" for their album of the same name alongside The Great Commission and The Air I Breathe. The band would finish the year as part of MyChildren MyBride winter headlining tour alongside Within the Ruins, Lionheart and I Declare War.

Could You Watch Your Children Burn (2011–2013)
On October 22, 2011, the band announced on Twitter that they had already begun work on their next release. At the end of December 2011, guitarist Anthony Thoma announced that he would be leaving the band to return to school and had played his last show with the band earlier that month and would be replaced by A Bullet for Pretty Boy's guitarist, Derrick Sechrist. The band would begin the year touring as a part of Whitechapel's "The Recorruptour" alongside fellow supporting acts Miss May I, After the Burial, Structures and Within the Ruins. Soon after the band announced that they would be returning to the studio in March to begin tracking their next album. In the spring it was announced that the band would be embarking on "The Dead Kid Tour" this summer along with My Ticket Home, For All I Am and Erra before joining Demon Hunter's "The True Defiance Tour" alongside Bleeding Through, Cancer Bats and Willows. The band would go on to replace Molotov Solution on Impending Doom's forthcoming July U.S. tour with Within the Ruins, Erra and To Each His Own.

At the end of the summer of 2012, the band announced that they would be releasing their forthcoming album sometime this fall through Rise Records. Shortly after they were confirmed to be a part of Iwrestledabearonce's North American "Ruining Earth for Everybody" headlining tour this fall with Oceano, Vanna, Within the Ruins and Surrounded by Monsters. By the fall, the band announced that they would be ending the year as part of Like Moths to Flames mini-headlining tour in support of the deluxe reissue of When We Don't Exist alongside Ice Nine Kills, Horizons and Assassins. Not too much time later the band began releasing studio footage of them hard at work on their forthcoming album. Following the announcement the band also revealed that their outing titled, Could You Watch Your Children Burn would have a January 15 release date. The band would bring in the new year as part of Whitechapel's and Emmure's co-headlining tour the "Brothers of Brutality Tour" with Unearth and Obey the Brave.

On December 10, the band released their first song from their forthcoming album, the aggressive track, "Premeditated" detailing vocalist Tewers hostility towards the individual that had victimized his girlfriend while on tour. Later that month, the band released the next song from their forthcoming record, the veracious "Fiction Religion". The last song the band would release promotionally before the January 15 release of their sophomore album would be "Digging Your Grave", a track about Of Mice & Men's former vocalist Austin Carlile for an undisclosed reason.

On February 18, 2013, the band would release the NSFW tortured themed music video for their track, "Premeditated". A month later the band were announced to be a part of Attack Attack!'s "Back in Action Tour" the band's first tour since changing up singers and would be supported by Get Scared, Dangerkids and Closer to Closure. A couple days later, the band released a music video for the song, "Fiction Religion". Drummer Cole Worden announced his amicable departure from the band in the summer of 2013 stepping down from the band to pursue steadier employment. Kevin Rutherford formerly of Like Moths to Flames' fame would unofficially take over as the band's new drummer being officially announced sometime later. The band released their final music video from their sophomore effort at the end of summer 2013, releasing the live video for their song, "Troll".

The Plot in You would embark on a summer overseas European and UK tour with direct support from I Declare War along with Empires Fade and Odessa providing split support for the tour. Followed by an Australian tour in September with For the Fallen Dreams, Storm the Sky and Fit for a King. They would end the year touring the US as part of Attila's "About That Life Tour" with Upon a Burning Body and Fit for a King. Later joined by Iwrestledabearonce completed the lineup for Attila's headlining tour.

Happiness in Self Destruction (2013–2016)
The band were revealed to be heading back into the studio after their fall tour with Attila and Upon a Burning Body to begin work on their next release. The band will also bring in the new year as part of For Today's headlining tour in support of their new album, Fight the Silence through Razor & Tie with support from Stray from the Path, Like Moths to Flames and Fit for a King. The band were revealed to be joining Motionless in White and The Defiled on a tour in March appearing on select dates with For the Fallen Dreams and For Today.

The band would join Chimaira on their summer headlining "The Artery Metal Tour" alongside fellow supporting acts; Upon This Dawning, Allegaeon and Silence the Messenger. Following that tour, the band would then find themselves a part of The Acacia Strain's fall North American tour along with Cane Hill. During those shows the band began playing the song, "Crows" live with the song expected to be featured on their third album.

At the beginning of 2015, the band announced that they would be embarking on a spring tour with Sworn In, I Declare War and Gift Giver. But before joining up with Sworn In and I Declare War the band was a part of a small spring tour with Outline in Color and Gift Giver. Packing in their spring the band were announced to be a part of the "New England Metal & Hardcore Festival" among other heavy metal acts Fit for an Autopsy, I Declare War, Lionheart and Boris the Blade.

On February 23, 2015, the band announced their departure from Rise Records thanking the label for being a tremendous help with their last few releases and that they are finishing up work on the next album and will be announcing a new label soon. Along with the announcement they released a music video for their new song, "My Old Ways" stating the song showcases the sound and feel of their new album. In March, they released the previously unreleased B-side, "Crows", a song they had been playing live at shows and were planning to release on a 7-inch that never came to fruition. On June 3, the band announced that they will be taking part in Like Moths to Flames' summer headlining tour in support of the band's new 7 inch, The Dream Is Dead alongside Myka Relocate, and Yuth Forever (formerly Villains). After their supportive run with Like Moths to Flames, they were announced to be playing a small headlining run of shows with Myka Relocate finishing up the summer.

In July, the band officially announced that they had signed to StaySick Recordings and would be releasing their new album in the fall with Tewers expressing his joy to be working with hard working and passionate people that are also friends they've known on a personal level. They would later announce that their third album, Happiness in Self Destruction, would be released on October 16, 2015 releasing a video detailing the hardships behind the new album. At the end of August, they released, "Take Me Away", the second single from their looming album with Tewers citing the song as the most meaningful songs on the record and a tribute to his late grandfather. In September, they released a music video for "Take Me Away". They released the last promotional single, "Dear Old Friend" from their forthcoming album on October 3. In December 2015, they announced that they would be beginning the year supporting Blessthefall on their headlining tour in February alongside Sirens and Sailors, Miss May I, and A War Within.

On June 28, 2016, they premiered a music video for their song, "Time Changes Everything", taken from the new album Happiness in Self Destruction directed by Mathias Arnell the band's current touring drummer.

Dispose (2017–2019)
On June 1, 2017, it was announced that they would be part of Fearless Records' newest Punk Goes... compilation album, Punk Goes Pop Vol. 7, along with other top and up-and-coming bands in today's alternative scene covering the biggest Top 40 hits with their own dynamic flair. The band would go on to include their cover of the James Bay song, "Let It Go", with the compilation album being released on July 14.

On June 15, The Plot in You announced that they had signed with Fearless Records stating that they excited to be a part of the "Fearless family" and that it's refreshing to have a team behind them with the ambition and the tools to bring life to the creative vision they've always had for the band. They celebrated with the signing by releasing the song, "Feel Nothing", a song from their upcoming and first album that Tewers' had worked with another producer. This also served as an announcement of the band's departure from StaySick Recordings. Later that month, they were announced to be a part of The Color Morale's summer headlining tour in support of their 2016 album, Desolate Divine, alongside Dayseeker and Picturesque. They would later announce that they would be joining Ice Nine Kills on their "Every Trick in the Book tour" with the band performing the album of the same name in full each night with support from Dayseeker, Ovtlier and Carousel Kings. On November 16, the band released a music video for the first single from their forthcoming album, "Not Just Breathing" along with the tracklisting and that the album would be released on February 16.

On January 5, 2018, they were announced to be bringing in the new year till spring accompanying We Came as Romans' in their "Cold Like War Tour" alongside Oceans Ate Alaska, Currents and Tempting Fate. On January 25, the band opened up about their upcoming album, Dispose stating that "breakdowns are no longer his main concern, that doesn't mean the band's sound is lightening up" and that the album would be the band's heaviest but not in the way that fans think. Also in January, the band were announced to be joining Polaris and Alpha Wolf on their spring Australian tour. By the end of January they were set up to finish touring the spring in Europe and the UK alongside We Came as Romans, Polaris and Alazka.

Beginning in February, the band would go on to release a music video for their new song, "Disposable Fix" on February 2 and "I Always Wanted to Leave" ironically released on Valentine's Day. The band began streaming their new album a day before its official release with Tewers issuing a statement on the overall style change. Stating: "...when I first started Plot I was a metalhead through and through. After touring with only heavy bands, recording heavy bands, and writing primarily heavy music for years it just became mundane... I simply don't listen to what I listened to eight to 10 years ago. I've gone through things in my earlier days that made sense to scream about, and could be conveyed properly through heavy music. These days that tone just doesn't work for the most part. I've written three and a half records worth of heavy music. I want to expand and challenge myself."

In June 2018, they were announced to be continuing their trek in Europe and the UK this fall alongside The Amity Affliction, Dream State and Endless Heights. By July, they were announced to be finishing up the year touring in support of Underoath's winter North American headlining tour with Dance Gavin Dance and Crown the Empire. The following day, the band released a music video for their emotional song, "The One You Loved".

At the end of January 2019, they were announced to be joining their pals Like Moths to Flames, Dayseeker and Limbs for an upcoming spring North American tour. In May 2019, The Plot in You announced a few headlining shows this summer around their appearance at this years 2019 "Rock USA" festival with an appearance by Ice Nine Kills at their Columbus, Ohio show. At the end of July, they were excited to announce that they would be a part of Sum 41's fall headlining tour with The Amity Affliction with Of Mice & Men appearing on the dates that The Amity Affliction won't. They would go on to play a select few shows on the off-dates from their tour with Sum 41 and The Amity Affliction.

Swan Song (2019–present)
On November 5, 2019, Landon announced on Instagram that he is working on new material for the band and his side project Ai640. It wouldn't be until the beginning of April 2020 that Tewers would go on to update the album's progress going on to state that: "...we're a little over half way done tracking the new plot record and I'm really excited to get another record out. The new shit is truly unlike anything we've ever done..". Tewers would also go onto release his melancholy solo track "Say It Ain't So" to tide fans over for the coming album. In May 2021, Tewers officially announced the album is completed.

On July 29, the band officially released the new lead single "Face Me" from their fifth studio album, Swan Song, which was released on September 17, 2021, along with its music video. At the same time, the band revealed the album cover and the track list. To promote the album, the band also announced that they will support Silverstein's rescheduled 20th anniversary tour along with Can't Swim in November 2021. On August 19, the band unveiled the second single "Enemy". On September 9, one week before the album release, the band released the third single "Paradigm" and its corresponding music video. On October 25, 2022, the band unveiled a brand new single "Divide". On December 1, the music video for the single was published. On February 8, 2023, the band released the single "Left Behind" along with an accompanying music video.

Musical style
The band's initial music featured a gritty metalcore sound with low-tuned guitars a hint of djent, slight melodies but an overall emphasis on dissonance and equally as gritty lyrics. Tewers used a guttural vocal style most typically found in deathcore music with minor use of sung vocals in their earlier music mirror their angry and gritty tone conveying his lyricism of dark themes. The band would go on to add some melodic elements in their future releases after incorporating the use of clean vocals during their debut album. Their sophomore album would mark a change a shift to faster aggressive music with the incorporation of industrial samples and even full songs with little to no screaming. By their third album the band began to stray away from their metalcore and deathcore roots leaving the aggression behind in favor of experimentation. By their fourth outing, Dispose, Tewers stated the album would be a different type of heavy with the band leaving breakdowns and the cliches of metalcore behind them for unpredictable with songs varying from alternative rock to electronica many switching seamlessly from genre to the next in a matter of seconds. The biggest change came with multi-instrumentalist Landon Tewers including help from the rest of the band in the creative process for Dispose with Tewers writing, recording and producing all of the band previous releases aside from drums and percussion on some of their older releases.

Band members
Current
 Landon Tewers (formerly of Before Their Eyes) – vocals, keyboards, programming (2010–present); guitars (2014–present); drums, percussion (2014–2015)
 Ethan Yoder (formerly of Walking Edith Park) – bass (2010–present)
 Josh Lewis Childress – guitars (2010–present)
 Michael Cooper – drums, percussion (2021–present)

Former
 Anthony Thoma – guitars (2010–2012)
 Cole Worden (formerly of Walking Edith Park) – drums, percussion (2010–2013)
 Derrick Sechrist (formerly of A Bullet for Pretty Boy) – guitars (2012–2014)
 Kevin Rutherford (formerly of Like Moths to Flames and Legion) – drums, percussion (2013–2014)
 Mathis Arnell (formerly of MyChildren MyBride) – drums, percussion (2015–2021)

Touring musicians
 Alex Ballew (Erra) – drums, percussion (2014–2015, 2017)

Timeline

Other projects
 In March 2014, vocalist Landon Tewers announced that he would be releasing a debut solo EP on April 1 describing it as "full of weird songs I can't use for anything else" debuting his first single, "Ma and Pa" along with the announcement. He would go on to stream his EP, entitled Dead Kid on March 31 a day before its intended release and set out on a tour that summer with support from Wind in Sails. After the debut of his solo project, Landon would begin releasing original music and covers infrequently for the following years sometimes under different monikers. On Christmas Eve of 2014, Landon released another solo song with the title, "I Hope You Have a Shitty Christmas", having written the song while drunk and releasing it to tide fans over until the next Plot in You release. Along with revealing that the band have a music video shot, a 7 inch ready to go and that he will be releasing some studio updates soon so that fans will have a taste of what's to come. In February 2015, continuing with appeasing fans with the wait for new Plot in You music Landon released another solo track this time a cover of Drake's "Hold On, We're Going Home" with Dream Pilot's Sean Macdonald providing the guest backup vocals for the track. On the 12, Landon shared another solo track, "I'll Always Be Proud" a song he wrote for his girlfriend when he was "borderline suicidal" which is set to appear on his forthcoming EP. Followed by the song "Feel You Out" three days later.
 In 2015, Landon revealed another side project this being the chaotic metalcore moniker, "Ai640" which he would be releasing a concept EP full of music that didn't fit with the Plot in You's third album. He released the first song for the project in June 2015, "Debate", beginning a series of releases that would continue the ever-growing story of the sentient robot "Ai640". Landon released the self-titled EP about the titular violent robot with artificial intelligence. Tewers would go on to follow this concept into a second EP with the title "Ai640, Pt. 2" in 2017 along with the supporting single, "Jane". It would not be until the end of 2019 that Tewers would release any more heavy music under the moniker "Ai640". And in 2020, Tewers would finally complete his six-year side project and release the last EP in his conceptual trilogy.
 In 2016, guitarist Josh Childress began releasing his own music first releasing a cover of Leonard Cohen's "Hallelujah" at the beginning of November then debuting his original song, "Always Blue" at the end of November featuring a more atmospheric alternative rock sound with gritty vocals as opposed to the metalcore typically found in The Plot in You's music. He would then go on to premiere his next song, "Bottle of Red" and reveal that he would be releasing an EP titled, Always Blue in December 9. On March 16, 2017, they released his next song, "Sell Your Soul" continuing with the atmospheric alternative rock style with progressive elements thrown in the mix. Two years later in 2019, Childress would release his cover of The Rolling Stones' song "Blinded by Rainbows" and release his second EP, A Little Lost Without You. premiering the promotional singles, "Think." and "Kind Eyes" for the release.

Discography

Studio albums

Extended plays

Singles

As featured artist

Album appearances

Music videos

References

External links
 

Metalcore musical groups from Ohio
Rise Records artists
Musical groups established in 2010
Heavy metal musical groups from Ohio
People from Findlay, Ohio
Fearless Records artists
2010 establishments in Ohio